Declan Patrick MacManus  (born 25 August 1954), known professionally as Elvis Costello, is an English singer-songwriter and record producer. He has won multiple awards in his career, including a Grammy Award in 2020, and has twice been nominated for the Brit Award for Best British Male Artist. In 2003, he was inducted into the Rock and Roll Hall of Fame. In 2004, Rolling Stone ranked Costello number 80 on its list of the 100 Greatest Artists of All Time.

Costello began his career as part of London's pub rock scene in the early 1970s and later became associated with the first wave of the British punk and new wave movement that emerged in the mid-to-late 1970s. His critically acclaimed debut album My Aim Is True was released in 1977. Shortly after recording it, he formed the Attractions as his backing band. His second album This Year's Model was released in 1978, and was ranked number 11 by Rolling Stone on its list of the best albums from 1967 to 1987. His third album Armed Forces was released in 1979, and features his highest-charting single, "Oliver's Army" (number 2 in the UK). His first three albums all appeared on Rolling Stones list of the 500 Greatest Albums of All Time in 2003.

Costello and the Attractions toured and recorded together for the better part of a decade, although differences between them caused a split by 1986. Much of Costello's work since has been as a solo artist, although reunions with members of the Attractions have been credited to the group over the years. Costello's lyrics employ a wide vocabulary and frequent wordplay. His music has drawn on many diverse genres; one critic described him as a "pop encyclopaedia", able to "reinvent the past in his own image".  Since 2002, his touring band (featuring a rotating cast of musicians) has been known as the Imposters.

Costello has co-written several original songs for films, including "God Give Me Strength" from Grace of My Heart (1996, with Burt Bacharach) and "The Scarlet Tide" from Cold Mountain (2003, with T-Bone Burnett). For the latter, Elvis was nominated (along with Burnett) for the Academy Award for Best Original Song and the Grammy Award for Best Song Written for Visual Media.

Early life
Declan Patrick MacManus was born on 25 August 1954 at St Mary's Hospital in Paddington, London, and is of Irish descent on his father's side. He is the son of Lilian Alda (née Ablett; 1927–2021) and Ross MacManus (1927–2011), a jazz trumpeter and vocalist who performed with the Joe Loss Orchestra, and later as a solo cabaret act. MacManus senior had a hit in Australia (as Day Costello) with his cover version of the Beatles' "The Long and Winding Road" in 1970.

MacManus lived in Twickenham, Middlesex, attending both St. Edmund's Catholic Primary School in nearby Whitton, and then Archbishop Myers Secondary Modern R.C. School – which is now St Mark's Catholic School – in neighbouring Hounslow.

In 1971, the 16-year-old MacManus moved with his mother to Birkenhead – not far from her home city of Liverpool – where he formed his first band, a folk duo called "Rusty", with Allan Mayes. After completing his education at St. Francis Xavier's College in Liverpool, MacManus worked at a number of office jobs to support himself, most famously at Elizabeth Arden, where he was employed as a data entry clerk. This is immortalised in the lyrics of "I'm Not Angry" as the "vanity factory". He also worked for a short period as a computer operator at the Midland Bank computer centre in Bootle.

He moved back to London in 1974, where he formed Flip City, a pub rock band which was active from 1974 until early 1976. Costello's first broadcast recording was with his father in a television commercial for R. White's Lemonade ("I'm a Secret Lemonade Drinker") which aired in 1974. His father sang the song, and Costello sang backing vocals; the advertisement won a silver award at the 1974 International Advertising Festival. He continued to write songs and began looking for a solo recording contract. In 1976 he was signed to independent label Stiff Records on the basis of a demo tape. His manager at Stiff, Jake Riviera, suggested that the singer, then calling himself D.P. Costello, his surname originating from his father’s stage name, Day Costello, begin using the first name Elvis after Elvis Presley.

Career

1970s 
On 25 March 1977, Stiff released Costello's first single, "Less Than Zero". Four months later his debut album, My Aim Is True (1977), was released to moderate commercial success (No. 14 in the UK and, later, Top 40 in the US), with Costello appearing on the cover in his trademark oversize eyeglasses, reminiscent of Buddy Holly. Costello failed to chart with his early singles, which included "Less Than Zero" and the ballad "Alison". Stiff's records were initially distributed only in the UK, which meant that Costello's first album and singles were available in the United States only as expensive imports. Angered that no U.S. record company had yet seen fit to release his records, Costello attempted to protest by giving a street performance outside a London convention of CBS Records executives, and was arrested for busking. Costello signed to Columbia Records, (CBS in the U.S.) a few months later.

The backing for Costello's debut album was provided by American West Coast band Clover, a country outfit living in England whose members would later go on to join Huey Lewis and the News and the Doobie Brothers. Costello released his first major hit single, "Watching the Detectives," which was recorded with Steve Nieve, Steve Goulding (drums) and Andrew Bodnar (bass)—the latter two being members of Graham Parker's backing band the Rumour. The song, added to the U.S. version of My Aim Is True, contains scathing verses about the vicarious enjoyment of television violence over a reggae beat. Later in 1977, Costello formed his own permanent backing band, the Attractions, consisting of Steve Nieve (piano), Bruce Thomas (bass guitar), and Pete Thomas (drums; no relation to Bruce Thomas).

On 17 December 1977, Costello and the Attractions, as a replacement act for the Sex Pistols, were scheduled to play "Less Than Zero" on Saturday Night Live; however, in imitation of a rebellious act by Jimi Hendrix on a BBC show, Costello stopped the song mid-intro, yelling "Stop! Stop!" to his band, and played "Radio Radio" instead – a song that criticises the commercialisation of the airwaves, which NBC and Lorne Michaels had forbidden them to play. Costello was subsequently banned from the show (the ban was lifted in 1989) and he received considerable attention as an angry young man. His insistence on performing "Radio Radio" on SNL proved a boon to his debut album, and its popularity exploded in the U.S. after the performance.

Following a tour with other Stiff artists – captured on the Live Stiffs Live album, which includes Costello's version of the Burt Bacharach/Hal David standard "I Just Don't Know What to Do With Myself" – the band recorded This Year's Model (1978). Some of the more popular tracks include the British hit "(I Don't Want to Go to) Chelsea" and "Pump It Up." His U.S. record company saw Costello as such a priority that his last name replaced the word Columbia on the label of the disc's original pressing. The Attractions' first tour of Australia in December 1978 was notable for a controversial performance at Sydney's Regent Theatre when, angered by the group's failure to perform an encore after their brief 35-minute set, audience members destroyed some of the seating. By the end of the 1970s Costello was firmly established as both performer and songwriter, with Linda Ronstadt and Dave Edmunds having success with his compositions.

A tour of the U.S. and Canada also saw the release of the much-bootlegged Canadian promo-only Live at the El Mocambo, recorded at a Toronto rock club, which finally saw an official release as part of the 2½ Years box set in 1993.

In 1979, he released his third album Armed Forces (originally to have been titled Emotional Fascism, a phrase that appeared on the album's inner sleeve). American editions included a 45rpm EP recorded live at the Hollywood High School Gymnasium in Hollywood in 1978. Both the album and the single "Oliver's Army" went to No. 2 in the UK, and the opening track "Accidents Will Happen" gained wide television exposure thanks to its innovative animated music video, directed by Annabel Jankel and Rocky Morton. Costello also found time in 1979 to produce the debut album of the 2 Tone ska revival band the Specials and worked as a backing vocalist on This Is Your Life, an album by new wave band Twist.

Costello's standing in the U.S. was bruised for a time when in March 1979, during a drunken argument with Stephen Stills and Bonnie Bramlett at a Holiday Inn bar in Columbus, Ohio, the singer referred to James Brown as a "jive-ass nigger," then upped the ante by pronouncing Ray Charles a "blind, ignorant nigger." Costello addressed the controversy at a New York City press conference a few days later, stating that he had been drunk and had been attempting to be obnoxious to bring the conversation to a swift conclusion, not anticipating that Bramlett would bring his comments to the press. According to Costello, "it became necessary for me to outrage these people with about the most obnoxious and offensive remarks that I could muster". In his liner notes for the expanded version of Get Happy!! Costello writes that some time after the incident he had declined an offer to meet Charles out of guilt and embarrassment, although Charles himself had forgiven Costello, saying "Drunken talk isn't meant to be printed in the paper." Costello worked extensively in Britain's Rock Against Racism campaign both before and after the incident. In an interview with Questlove (drummer for the Roots, with whom Costello collaborated in 2013), he stated: "It's upsetting because I can't explain how I even got to think you could be funny about something like that," and further elaborating with, "I'm sorry. You know? It's about time I said it out loud."

Costello is also an avid country music fan and has cited George Jones as his favourite country singer. In 1977, he appeared on Jones' duet album My Very Special Guests, contributing "Stranger in the House," which they later performed together on an HBO special dedicated to Jones.

1980s
The soul-infused Get Happy!! was the first of Costello's many experiments with genres beyond those with which he is ordinarily associated. It also marked a distinct change in mood from the angry, frustrated tone of his first three albums to a more upbeat, happy manner. The single, "I Can't Stand Up for Falling Down" was an old Sam and Dave song (though Costello increased the tempo considerably). Lyrically, the songs are full of Costello's signature word play, to the point that he later felt he had become something of a self-parody and toned it down on later releases; he has mockingly described himself in interviews as "rock and roll's Scrabble champion". His only 1980 appearance in North America was at the Heatwave festival in August near Toronto.

In January 1981, Costello released Trust amidst growing tensions within the Attractions, particularly between Bruce and Pete Thomas. In the U.S., the single "Watch Your Step" was released and played live on Tom Snyder's Tomorrow show, and received airplay on FM rock radio. In the UK, the single "Clubland" scraped the lower reaches of the charts; follow-up single "From a Whisper to a Scream" (a duet with Glenn Tilbrook of Squeeze) became the first Costello single in over four years to completely miss the charts. Costello also co-produced Squeeze's popular 1981 album East Side Story (with Roger Bechirian) and performed backing vocals on the group's hit "Tempted".

October saw the release of Almost Blue, an album of country music cover songs written by the likes of Hank Williams ("Why Don't You Love Me (Like You Used to Do?)"), Merle Haggard ("Tonight the Bottle Let Me Down") and Gram Parsons ("How Much I Lied"). The album, which received mixed reviews, was a tribute to the country music that Costello had grown up listening to, especially George Jones. The first pressings of the record in the UK bore a sticker with the message: "WARNING: This album contains country & western music and may cause a radical reaction in narrow minded listeners". Almost Blue did spawn a surprise UK hit single in a version of George Jones' "Good Year for the Roses" (written by Jerry Chesnut), which reached No. 6.

Imperial Bedroom (1982) had a much darker sound, due in part to the lavish production of Geoff Emerick, famed for engineering several Beatles records. It remains one of his most critically acclaimed records, but again it failed to produce any hit singles—"You Little Fool" and the critically acclaimed "Man Out of Time" both failed to reach the Top 40 in the UK. Costello has said he disliked the marketing pitch for the album. Imperial Bedroom also features Costello's song "Almost Blue", inspired by the music of jazz singer and trumpeter Chet Baker, who would later perform and record a version of the song (on Chet Baker in Tokyo).

In 1983, he released Punch the Clock, featuring female backing vocal duo (Afrodiziak) and a four-piece horn section (the TKO Horns), alongside the Attractions. Clive Langer (who co-produced with Alan Winstanley), provided Costello with a melody which eventually became "Shipbuilding", which featured a trumpet solo by Baker. Prior to the release of Costello's own version, a version of the song was a minor UK hit for former Soft Machine founder Robert Wyatt.

Under the pseudonym The Imposter, Costello released "Pills and Soap", an attack on the changes in British society brought on by Thatcherism, released to coincide with the run-up to the 1983 UK general election. Punch the Clock also generated an international hit in the single "Everyday I Write the Book", aided by a music video featuring lookalikes of the Prince Charles and Princess Diana undergoing domestic strife in a suburban home. The song became Costello's first Top 40 hit single in the U.S. Also in the same year, Costello provided vocals on a version of the Madness song "Tomorrow's Just Another Day" released as a B-side.

Tensions within the band – notably between Costello and bassist Bruce Thomas – were beginning to tell, and Costello announced his retirement and the break-up of the group shortly before they were to record Goodbye Cruel World (1984). Costello would later say of this record that they had "got it as wrong as you can in terms of the execution". The record was poorly received upon its initial release; the liner notes to the 1995 Rykodisc re-release, penned by Costello, begin with the words "Congratulations! You've just purchased our worst album". Costello's retirement, although short-lived, was accompanied by two compilations, Elvis Costello: The Man in the UK, Europe and Australia, and The Best of Elvis Costello & The Attractions in the U.S.

In 1985, he appeared in the Live Aid benefit concert in England, singing the Beatles' "All You Need Is Love" as a solo artist. (The event was overrunning and Costello was asked to "ditch the band".) Costello introduced the song as an "old northern English folk song", and the audience was invited to sing the chorus. In the same year Costello teamed up with friend T-Bone Burnett for the single "The People's Limousine" under the moniker of The Coward Brothers. That year, Costello also produced Rum Sodomy & the Lash for the Irish punk/folk band the Pogues.

1985 also saw Costello appear in the Alan Bleasdale film No Surrender, playing a small role as a very bad stage magician hired to perform at a seedy Liverpool night club on a bleak New Year's Eve.

Growing antipathy between Costello and Bruce Thomas contributed to the Attractions' first split in 1986 when Costello was preparing to make a comeback. Working in the U.S. with Burnett, a band containing a number of Elvis Presley's sidemen (including James Burton and Jerry Scheff), and minor input from the Attractions, he produced King of America, an acoustic guitar-driven album with a country sound. It was billed as performed by "The Costello Show featuring the Attractions and Confederates" in the UK and Europe and "The Costello Show featuring Elvis Costello" in North America. Around this time he legally changed his name back to Declan MacManus, adding Aloysius as an extra middle name. Costello retooled his upcoming tour to allow for multiple nights in each city, playing one night with the Confederates, one night with the Attractions, and one night solo acoustic. In May 1986, he performed at Self Aid, a benefit concert held in Dublin that focused on the chronic unemployment which was widespread in Ireland at that time.

Later that year, Costello returned to the studio with the Attractions and recorded Blood & Chocolate, which was lauded for a post-punk fervour not heard since 1978's This Year's Model. It also marked the return of producer Nick Lowe, who had produced Costello's first five albums. While Blood & Chocolate failed to chart a hit single of any significance, it did produce what has since become one of Costello's signature concert songs, "I Want You". On this album, Costello adopted the alias Napoleon Dynamite, the name he later attributed to the character of the emcee that he played during the vaudeville-style tour to support Blood & Chocolate. (The pseudonym had previously been used in 1982, when the B-side single "Imperial Bedroom" was credited to Napoleon Dynamite & the Royal Guard; whether the title of the 2004 film Napoleon Dynamite was inspired by Costello is disputed). After the tour for Blood & Chocolate, Costello split from the Attractions, due mostly to tensions between Costello and Bruce Thomas. Costello would continue to work with Attraction Pete Thomas as a session musician for future releases.

Costello's recording contract with Columbia Records ended after Blood & Chocolate. In 1987 he released a compilation album, Out of Our Idiot, on his UK label, Demon Records consisting of B-sides, side projects, and unreleased songs from recording sessions from 1980 to 1987. He signed a new contract with Warner Bros. and in early 1989 released Spike, which spawned his biggest single in the U.S., the Top 20 hit "Veronica", one of several songs Costello co-wrote with Paul McCartney. At the 1989 MTV Video Music Awards on 6 September in Los Angeles, "Veronica" won the MTV Award for Best Male Video.

1990s 
In 1991, Costello released Mighty Like a Rose, which featured the single "The Other Side of Summer". He also co-composed and co-produced, with Richard Harvey, the title and incidental music for the mini-series G.B.H. by Alan Bleasdale. This entirely instrumental, and largely orchestral, soundtrack garnered a BAFTA, for Best Music for a TV Series for the pair.

In 1993, Costello experimented with classical music with a critically acclaimed collaboration with the Brodsky Quartet on The Juliet Letters. During this period, he wrote a full album's worth of material for Wendy James, and these songs became the tracks on her 1993 solo album Now Ain't the Time for Your Tears. Costello returned to rock and roll the following year with a project that reunited him with the Attractions, Brutal Youth. In 1995, he released Kojak Variety, an album of cover songs recorded five years earlier, and followed in 1996 with an album of songs originally written for other artists, All This Useless Beauty. This was the final album of original material that he issued under his Warner Bros. contract, and also his final album with the Attractions.

In the spring of 1996, Costello played a series of intimate club dates, backed only by Steve Nieve on the piano, in support of All This Useless Beauty. An ensuing summer and fall tour with the Attractions proved to be the death knell for the band. With relations between Costello and bassist Bruce Thomas at a breaking point, Costello announced that the current tour would be the Attractions' last. The quartet performed their final U.S. show in Seattle, Washington on 1 September 1996, before wrapping up their tour in Japan. Costello would still continue to work frequently with Attractions Steve Nieve and Pete Thomas; eventually, both would be members of Costello's new back-up band, The Imposters.

To fulfill his contractual obligations to Warner Bros., Costello released a greatest hits album titled Extreme Honey (1997). It contained an original track titled "The Bridge I Burned", featuring Costello's son, Matt, on bass. In the intervening period, Costello had served as artistic chair for the 1995 Meltdown Festival, which gave him the opportunity to explore his increasingly eclectic musical interests. His involvement in the festival yielded a one-off live EP with jazz guitarist Bill Frisell, which featured both cover material and a few of his own songs.

In 1998, Costello signed a multi-label contract with Polygram Records, sold by its parent company the same year to become part of the Universal Music Group. Costello released his new work on what he deemed the suitable imprimatur within the family of labels. His first new release as part of this contract involved a collaboration with Burt Bacharach. Their work had commenced earlier, in 1996, on a song called "God Give Me Strength" for the movie Grace of My Heart. This led the pair to write and record the critically acclaimed album Painted From Memory, released under his new contract in 1998, on the Mercury Records label, featuring songs that were largely inspired by the dissolution of his marriage to Cait O'Riordan. Costello and Bacharach performed several concerts with full orchestral backing, and also recorded an updated version of Bacharach's "I'll Never Fall in Love Again" for the soundtrack to Austin Powers: The Spy Who Shagged Me, with both appearing in the film to perform the song. He also wrote "I Throw My Toys Around" for The Rugrats Movie and performed it with No Doubt. The same year, he collaborated with Paddy Moloney of The Chieftains on "The Long Journey Home" on the soundtrack of the PBS/Disney The Irish in America: Long Journey Home miniseries. The soundtrack won a Grammy in 1999.

In 1999, Costello contributed a version of "She", released in 1974 by Charles Aznavour and Herbert Kretzmer, for the soundtrack of the film Notting Hill, with Trevor Jones producing. For the 25th anniversary of Saturday Night Live, Costello was invited to the programme, where he re-enacted his abrupt song-switch: This time, however, he interrupted the Beastie Boys' "Sabotage", and they acted as his backing group for "Radio Radio".

2000s 

From 2001 to 2005, Costello re-issued his back catalogue in the U.S., from My Aim Is True (1977) to All This Useless Beauty (1996), on double-disc collections on the Rhino Records label. These releases, which each contained second discs of bonus material, ultimately fell out of print by 2007 after Universal Music acquired the rights to Costello's catalogue. Universal subsequently released new deluxe editions of My Aim Is True and This Year's Model with new bonus material of full-length concerts from the time of each album's release. These deluxe editions also fell out of print and Universal has reverted to re-releasing Costello's pre-1987 albums in their original context without bonus material.

In 2000, Costello appeared at the Town Hall, New York, in Steve Nieve's opera Welcome to the Voice, alongside Ron Sexsmith and John Flansburgh of They Might Be Giants. In 2001, Costello was artist-in-residence at UCLA and wrote the music for a new ballet. He produced and appeared on an album of pop songs for the classical singer Anne Sofie von Otter. He released the album When I Was Cruel in 2002 on Island Records, and toured with a new band, the Imposters (essentially the Attractions but with a different bass player, Davey Faragher, formerly of Cracker). He appeared as himself in the "How I Spent My Strummer Vacation" episode of The Simpsons.

On 23 February 2003, Costello, along with Bruce Springsteen, Steve Van Zandt, and Dave Grohl, performed a version of the Clash's "London Calling" at the 45th Grammy Awards ceremony, in honour of Clash frontman Joe Strummer, who had died the previous December. In March, Elvis Costello & the Attractions were inducted into the Rock and Roll Hall of Fame. He announced his engagement in May to Canadian jazz singer and pianist Diana Krall, whom he had seen in concert and then met backstage at the Sydney Opera House in Australia. That September, he released North, an album of piano-based ballads concerning the breakdown of his former marriage, and his falling in love with Krall. Also that year, Costello made an appearance in the television series Frasier as a folk singer in the Cafe Nervosa, sending Frasier and Niles on a search for a new coffee bar.

On 12 March 2003, Costello filled in for David Letterman on the Late Show with David Letterman for the evening while Letterman was recovering from an eye infection.

The song "Scarlet Tide" (co-written by Costello and T-Bone Burnett and used in the film Cold Mountain) was nominated for a 2004 Academy Award; he performed it at the awards ceremony with Alison Krauss, who sang the song on the official soundtrack. Costello co-wrote many songs on Krall's 2004 CD, The Girl in the Other Room, the first of hers to feature several original compositions. In July 2004, Costello's first full-scale orchestral work, Il Sogno, was performed in New York. The work, a ballet after Shakespeare's A Midsummer Night's Dream, was commissioned by Italian dance troupe Aterballeto, and received critical acclaim from the classical music critics. Performed by the London Symphony Orchestra, conducted by Michael Tilson Thomas, the recording was released on CD in September by Deutsche Grammophon. In September 2004, Costello released the album The Delivery Man, recorded in Oxford, Mississippi, on Lost Highway Records, and it was hailed as one of his best.

A CD recording of a collaboration with Marian McPartland on her show Piano Jazz was released in 2005. It featured Costello singing six jazz standards and two of his own songs, accompanied by McPartland on piano. In November, Costello started recording a new album with Allen Toussaint and producer Joe Henry. The River in Reverse was released in the UK on the Verve label the following year in May.

A 2005 tour included a gig at Glastonbury that Costello considered so dreadful that he said "I don't care if I ever play England again. That gig made up my mind I wouldn't come back. I don't get along with it. We lost touch. It's 25 years since I lived there. I don't dig it, they don't dig me....British music fans don't have the same attitude to age as they do in America, where young people come to check out, say Willie Nelson. They feel some connection with him and find a role for that music in their lives".

After Hurricane Katrina, Costello and Allen Toussaint performed in New York at a series of Hurricane Relief benefit concerts in September 2006. By week's end, Costello had written "The River in Reverse", performed it with Toussaint and discussed plans for an album with Verve Records executives. The result was Costello's The River in Reverse which is a collaboration with New Orleanian, Allen Toussaint and recorded with The Crescent City Horns. Costello turned to older songs to reflect the national malaise at the time.

In a studio recording of Nieve's opera Welcome to the Voice (2006, Deutsche Grammophon), Costello interpreted the character of Chief of Police, with Barbara Bonney, Robert Wyatt, Sting and Amanda Roocroft, and the album reached No. 2 in the Billboard classical charts. Costello later reprised the piece on the stage of the Théâtre du Châtelet in Paris in 2008, with Sting, Joe Sumner (Sting's son) and Sylvia Schwartz. Also released in 2006 was a live recording of a concert with the Metropole Orkest at the North Sea Jazz Festival, entitled My Flame Burns Blue. The soundtrack for House, M.D. featured Costello's interpretation of "Beautiful" by Christina Aguilera, with the song appearing in the second episode of Season 2.

Costello was commissioned to write a chamber opera by the Danish Royal Opera, Copenhagen, on the subject of Hans Christian Andersen's infatuation with Swedish soprano Jenny Lind. Called The Secret Songs, it remained unfinished. In a performance in 2007 directed by Kasper Bech Holten at the Opera's studio theatre (Takelloftet), finished songs were interspersed with pieces from Costello's 1993 collaborative classical album The Juliet Letters, featuring Danish soprano Sine Bundgaard as Lind. The 2009 album Secret, Profane & Sugarcane includes material from Secret Songs.

On 22 April 2008, Momofuku was released on Lost Highway Records, the same imprint that released The Delivery Man, his previous studio album. The album was, at least initially, released exclusively on vinyl (with a code to download a digital copy). That summer, in support of the album, Costello toured with the Police on the final leg of their 2007/2008 Reunion Tour. Costello played a homecoming gig at the Liverpool Philharmonic Hall on 25 June 2006. and, that month, gave his first performance in Poland, appearing with The Imposters for the closing gig of the Malta theatre festival in Poznań.

In July 2008, Costello (as Declan McManus) appeared in his home city Liverpool where he was awarded an honorary degree of Doctor of Music from the University of Liverpool. Between 2008 and 2010, Costello hosted Channel 4/CTV's series Spectacle in which Costello talked and performed with stars in various fields, styled similarly to Inside the Actors Studio. Between its two seasons, the show compiled 20 episodes, including one where Costello was interviewed by actress Mary-Louise Parker. Costello was featured on Fall Out Boy's 2008 album Folie à Deux, providing vocals on the track "What a Catch, Donnie", along with other artists who are friends with the band.

Costello appeared in Stephen Colbert's television special A Colbert Christmas: The Greatest Gift of All. In the program, he was eaten by a bear, but later saved by Santa Claus; he also sang a duet with Colbert. The special was first aired on 23 November 2008. Costello released Secret, Profane & Sugarcane, a collaboration with T-Bone Burnett, on 9 June 2009. It was his first on the Starbucks Hear Music label and a return to country music in the manner of Good Year for the Roses.

Costello appeared as himself in the finale of the third season of 30 Rock and sang in the episode's celebrity telethon, "Kidney Now!". The episode references Costello's given name when Jack Donaghy accuses him of concealing his true identity: "Declan McManus, international art thief".

In May 2009, Costello made a surprise cameo appearance on-stage at the Beacon Theatre in New York as part of Spinal Tap's Unwigged and Unplugged show, singing their fictional 1965 hit "Gimme Some Money" with the band backing him up.

2010s
On 15 May 2010, Costello announced he would withdraw from a concert performed in Israel in opposition to Israel's treatment of Palestinians. In a statement on his website, Costello wrote, "It has been necessary to dial out the falsehoods of propaganda, the double game and hysterical language of politics, the vanity and self-righteousness of public communiqués from cranks in order to eventually sift through my own conflicted thoughts".

Also in 2010, Elvis Costello appeared as himself in David Simon's television series, Treme. Costello released the album National Ransom in autumn of 2010. In 2011, Costello appeared as himself on Sesame Street to perform a song with Elmo and Cookie Monster, titled "Monster Went and Ate My Red 2", a play on "(The Angels Wanna Wear My) Red Shoes".

On 26 February 2012, Costello paid tribute to music legends Chuck Berry and Leonard Cohen, who were the recipients of the first annual PEN Awards for songwriting excellence, at the JFK Presidential Library, in Boston, Massachusetts, on 26 February 2012. In September 2013 Costello released Wise Up Ghost, a collaboration with the Roots. On 25 October 2013, Costello was awarded an Honorary Doctorate of Music from the New England Conservatory. His memoir Unfaithful Music & Disappearing Ink was released in October 2015.

On 12 October 2018, Costello released his first studio album in five years, Look Now, recorded with The Imposters. The album features three songs co-written with Burt Bacharach, and one song co-written with Carole King. Costello wrote and produced a large majority of the album himself, with help from producer Sebastian Krys. On 26 January 2020, Look Now won the Grammy Award for Best Traditional Pop Vocal Album at the 62nd Grammy Awards.

Costello was appointed Officer of the Order of the British Empire (OBE) in the 2019 Birthday Honours for services to music.

2020s 
In 2021, Costello released Spanish Model, a remix of 1978's This Year's Model with Spanish lyrics. Singers from Spanish-speaking parts of the world, with help from Spanish-speaking songwriters, translated all 16 songs of the album into Spanish, with the new vocals set to the original recording and instrumentation by the Attractions. The singers included Juanes, Jorge Drexler, Luis Fonsi, Francisca Valenzuela, Fuego, Draco Rosa, and Fito Páez.

In 2021, Costello appeared at the Royal Variety Performance playing two songs with the Imposters. He was introduced by the MC Alan Carr as a man who has achieved everything except appearing at the Royal Variety Performance. Between songs Costello informed the audience that he was the second McManus to appear. His father Ross appeared in the 1960's with "If I Had a Hammer".

In January 2022, he performed on The Graham Norton Show. That same month he released the LP The Boy Named If, recorded with the Imposters.

Personal life

Relationships

Costello has been married three times, the first time in 1974 to Mary Burgoyne, with whom he had a son, Matthew. Toward the end of his first marriage, Costello became embroiled in an on-again/off-again romance with Bebe Buell, then-girlfriend of Todd Rundgren. Buell has said she was the inspiration behind some of Costello's most bitter love songs from the Armed Forces era, though Costello countered by claiming most of those songs had been written before he met Buell.

In 1985, Costello became involved with Cait O'Riordan, then the bassist of London Irish group the Pogues, while he was producing the Pogues' album Rum Sodomy and the Lash. They married in 1986 and split up by the end of 2002.

Costello became engaged to pianist-vocalist Diana Krall in May 2003, and married her at the home of Elton John on 6 December that year. Krall gave birth to twin sons on 6 December 2006 in New York City.

Vegetarianism
A pescatarian since the early 1980s, Costello says he was moved to reject meat after seeing the documentary The Animals Film (1982), which also helped inspire his song "Pills and Soap" from 1983's Punch the Clock. In January 2013, Costello teamed up with Paul McCartney to create an ad campaign backing vegetarian foods produced by the Linda McCartney Foods brand.

Football
Costello is a keen football fan, supporting Premier League football club Liverpool F.C. since childhood, and appeared on Channel 4's Football Italia as a pundit. On 25 May 2005, Costello was due to take the stage with his band at a gig in Norwich, which clashed with Liverpool appearing in the 2005 UEFA Champions League Final against AC Milan. With Liverpool losing 3–0 at half time, Costello was due on stage and began warming up his voice in preparation for the gig, before deciding: "I might as well see the first few minutes of the second half". With Liverpool staging a remarkable comeback (since dubbed the Miracle of Istanbul) by scoring three goals in six minutes and making it 3–3, Costello delayed his appearance on stage for over an hour. With the game going to penalties, after much delay he had no choice but to take the stage, with Costello recalling: "I tried my best to keep my eyes from the TV screen over the bar at the back of the room but the words 'Oh shit, he's missed' might have accidentally crept into the lyrics of 'Good Year for the Roses'". With Liverpool prevailing while he was on stage, an ecstatic Costello broke out into a performance of the club's anthem "You'll Never Walk Alone".

Health 
In July 2018, Costello cancelled the remaining six dates of his European tour on doctor's orders, while recovering from surgery to treat cancer. Costello apologised to his fans and said he initially thought he had recovered enough from the surgery to complete the tour.

Humanitarian causes 
Costello sits on the Advisory Board of the board of directors of the Jazz Foundation of America. Costello began working with the Jazz Foundation in 2001, and has been a featured performer in their annual benefit A Great Night in Harlem since 2006. Costello has donated his time working with the Jazz Foundation of America to save the homes and the lives of America's elderly jazz and blues musicians, including musicians who survived Hurricane Katrina. He has also performed at a benefit concert for the Seva Foundation.

In 2017 Costello helped establish the Musician Treatment Foundation (MTF) as a member of the Board of Directors to help under- and uninsured professional musicians receive free orthopedic care for upper limb injuries.  He performed his one man show for the foundation's first benefit in October 2017 at The Paramount Theater in Austin, Texas.  For MTF's five-year anniversary benefit, Costello produced with T Bone Burnett a special concert -- Elvis Costello & Friends:  King of America & Other Realms at Austin City Limits Live on 2 December 2022.

Collaborations
In addition to his major recorded collaborations with Burt Bacharach, the Brodsky Quartet, and Anne Sofie von Otter, Costello has frequently been involved in other collaborations.

In 1981, Glenn Tilbrook from Squeeze and Martin Belmont from the Rumour guested on the song "From a Whisper to a Scream" from the album Trust. Around this time he also collaborated with Chris Difford, also of Squeeze, to write additional lyrics for the song "Boy With a Problem", which appeared on Costello's 1982 album Imperial Bedroom. In 1984, Daryl Hall provided backing vocals on the song "The Only Flame in Town" from the album Goodbye Cruel World. The following year he sang with Annie Lennox on the song "Adrian" from the Eurythmics record Be Yourself Tonight.

In 1987, Costello began a songwriting collaboration with Paul McCartney. They wrote a number of songs together in a short period of time, that were released over a period of years. These songs included:
 "Back On My Feet", the B-side of McCartney's 1987 single "Once Upon a Long Ago", later added as a bonus track on the 1993 re-issue of McCartney's Flowers in the Dirt
 Costello's "Veronica" and "Pads, Paws and Claws" from his album Spike (1989)
 McCartney's "My Brave Face", "Don't Be Careless Love", "That Day Is Done" and the McCartney/Costello duet "You Want Her Too", all from McCartney's Flowers in the Dirt (1989)
 "So Like Candy" and "Playboy to a Man" from Costello's Mighty Like a Rose (1991)
 "The Lovers That Never Were" and "Mistress and Maid" from McCartney's Off the Ground (1993).
 "Shallow Grave" from Costello's All This Useless Beauty (1996).
 Costello has also issued solo demo recordings of "Veronica", "Pads, Paws and Claws" and "Mistress and Maid" (a song he did not otherwise record). Two other McCartney/Costello compositions remained officially unissued, while existing as widely bootlegged demos ("Tommy's Coming Home" and "Twenty Fine Fingers"). These two tracks, along with demos of other songs from their collaboration, did eventually see release on the Paul McCartney Archive edition of Flowers in the Dirt.

In 1987, he appeared on the HBO special Roy Orbison and Friends, A Black and White Night, which featured his long-time idol Roy Orbison. In 1988, Costello co-wrote "The Other End (Of the Telescope)" with Aimee Mann; this song appears on the Til Tuesday album Everything's Different Now.

In 1994, he sang "They Can't Take That Away from Me" with Tony Bennett for MTV Unplugged, appearing on the album released from the broadcast. In 2000, Costello wrote lyrics to "Green Song", a solo cello piece by Svante Henryson; this song appears on the Anne Sofie von Otter album For the Stars.

In 2005, Costello performed with Green Day frontman Billie Joe Armstrong. They played both Costello and Green Day songs together, including "Alison", "No Action", "Basket Case" and "Good Riddance (Time of Your Life)". In late 2005 Costello performed with Allen Toussaint in New York City at some Hurricane Katrina Relief Concerts and produced the studio album The River in Reverse. Also, Costello had a collaborative history with Toussaint, beginning with a couple of scattered album tracks in the 1980s, and skipping ahead to the aftermath of Hurricane Katrina with the production of The River in Reverse.

In 2006, Costello performed with Fiona Apple in the Decades Rock TV special. Apple performed two Costello songs and Costello performed two Apple songs.

In 2007, Costello collaborated with the Argentinean/Uruguayan electro-tango band Bajofondo on the song "Fairly Right" from the album Mar Dulce. In 2008, Costello collaborated with Fall Out Boy on the track "What a Catch, Donnie" from their album Folie a Deux. In Jenny Lewis' 2008 release, Acid Tongue, Costello provided vocals for the song "Carpetbaggers". In November 2009, Costello appeared live with Bruce Springsteen and the E Street Band at Madison Square Garden and performed the Jackie Wilson song "(Your Love Keeps Lifting Me) Higher and Higher".

In December 2009, Costello portrayed The Shape on the album Ghost Brothers of Darkland County, a collaboration between rock singer John Mellencamp and novelist Stephen King. In February 2010, Costello appeared in the live cinecast of Garrison Keillor's Prairie Home Companion, singing some of his own songs, and participating in many of the show's other musical and acting performances. On 30 April 2011, he played the song "Pump it Up" with the Odds before the start of a Vancouver Canucks playoff game at Rogers Arena in Vancouver, British Columbia.

In 2012, he played ukulele, mandolin, guitar and added backing vocals on Diana Krall's 11th studio album, Glad Rag Doll (as "Howard Coward"). On 10 September 2013, he played during the Apple September 2013 Event after the introduction of iTunes Radio, iPhone 5C and 5S at Town Hall, at the Apple campus.

On Gov't Mule's album Shout!, released in September 2013, he sang on the track "Funny Little Tragedy". In March 2014, Costello recorded Lost on the River: The New Basement Tapes with Rhiannon Giddens, Taylor Goldsmith, Jim James and Marcus Mumford. During the 2016 Detour, he performs with Larkin Poe.

Legacy
Costello has worked with Paul McCartney, Madness, Tony Bennett, Burt Bacharach, Allen Toussaint, T Bone Burnett, Lucinda Williams, Johnny Cash, Kid Rock, Lee Konitz, Brian Eno, and Rubén Blades.

Costello, in print, often champions the works of others. He has written several pieces for the magazine Vanity Fair, including a summary of what a perfect weekend of music would be. He has contributed to two Grateful Dead tribute albums and covered Jerry Garcia/Robert Hunter tunes "Ship of Fools", "Friend of the Devil", "It Must Have Been the Roses", "Ripple" and "Tennessee Jed" in concert. His collaboration with Bacharach honoured Bacharach's place in pop music history. Costello appeared in documentaries about singers Dusty Springfield, Brian Wilson, Wanda Jackson, Ron Sexsmith and Memphis, Tennessee-based Stax Records. He has interviewed one of his own influences, Joni Mitchell, and appeared on the release A Tribute to Joni Mitchell performing "Edith and the Kingpin". He performed the title track of the Charles Mingus tribute collection, Weird Nightmare. He appeared on the Nick Lowe tribute album Labour of Love, performing the Lowe song "Egypt" and the Gram Parsons tribute album The Return of the Grievous Angel, performing the Parsons song "Sleepless Nights". He was instrumental in bringing Sexsmith to a wider audience in 1995 by championing his debut album in Mojo magazine, even appearing on the cover with Sexsmith's debut album.

In 2004, Rolling Stone ranked him No. 80 on their list of the 100 Greatest Artists of All Time. In 2012, Costello was among the British cultural icons selected by artist Sir Peter Blake to appear in a new version of his most famous artwork – the Beatles' Sgt. Pepper's Lonely Hearts Club Band album cover – to celebrate the British cultural figures of his life that he most admires, to mark his 80th birthday. On being chosen, Costello remarked, "I always dreamed that I might one day stand in the boots of Albert Stubbins [the Liverpool footballer who appeared in the original artwork]".

Tribute albums 

 1998: Bespoke Songs, Lost Dogs, Detours & Rendezvous – (various artists)
 2002: Almost You: The Songs of Elvis Costello – (various artists)
 2003: The Elvis Costello Songbook – Bonnie Brett
 2004: A Tribute to Elvis Costello – Patrik Tanner
 2004: Davis Does Elvis – Stuart Davis
 2008: Every Elvis Has His Impersonators: 7 Homemade Remade Elvis Costello Songs – Elastic No–No Band

Discography

Studio albums
(including those with the Attractions, The Costello Show, and the Imposters)
My Aim Is True (1977)
This Year's Model (1978)
Armed Forces (1979)
Get Happy!! (1980)
Trust (1981)
Almost Blue (1981)
Imperial Bedroom (1982)
Punch the Clock (1983)
Goodbye Cruel World (1984)
King of America (1986)
Blood & Chocolate (1986)
Spike (1989)
Mighty Like a Rose (1991)
Brutal Youth (1994)
Kojak Variety (1995)
All This Useless Beauty (1996)
When I Was Cruel (2002)
North (2003)
Il Sogno (2004)
The Delivery Man (2004)
Momofuku (2008)
Secret, Profane & Sugarcane (2009)
National Ransom (2010)
Look Now (2018)
Hey Clockface (2020)
The Boy Named If (2022)

Collaborative albums
 The Courier (1988, soundtrack for the film, orchestral music by Declan MacManus, 8 songs by other artists including U2 and Hothouse Flowers)
G.B.H. (1991, with Richard Harvey)
The Juliet Letters (1993, with the Brodsky Quartet)
Jake's Progress (1995, with Richard Harvey)
Deep Dead Blue (1995, with Bill Frisell)
Painted from Memory (1998, with Burt Bacharach)
For the Stars (2001, with Anne Sofie von Otter)
Piano Jazz (2005, with Marian McPartland)
My Flame Burns Blue (2006, with Metropol Orkest)
The River in Reverse (2006, with Allen Toussaint)
Wise Up Ghost (2013, with the Roots)
Lost on the River (2014, as a member of The New Basement Tapes)
The Resurrection Of Rust (2022, with Rusty)

Filmography

As actor
 1979 film debut as "The Earl of Manchester" in Americathon. Costello and the Attractions mime the song "Crawling to the U.S.A." in the film, which also appears on its soundtrack album.
 1984 as "Henry Scully" in the UK TV series, Scully
 1984 as "Stone Deaf A&R Man" in The Bullshitters, a movie made by members of the comedy troupe The Comic Strip, first aired on Channel 4
 1985 as inept magician "Rosco de Ville" in the Alan Bleasdale film, No Surrender
 1987 as "Hives the Butler" in the Alex Cox film, Straight to Hell, starring Joe Strummer and Courtney Love. Costello's "Big Nothing" (AKA "Town Called Big Nothing") appears in the film and on its soundtrack album.
 1994 as himself on The Larry Sanders Show in the episode "People's Choice"
 1996 as himself on The Larry Sanders Show in the episode "Everybody Loves Larry"
 1997 as a barman in Spice World
 1999 as himself in Austin Powers: The Spy Who Shagged Me, performing Burt Bacharach's "I'll Never Fall In Love Again" (with Bacharach), which also appears on its soundtrack album.
 1999 as a younger version of himself in 200 Cigarettes
 2001 as himself performing "Fly Me to the Moon" on the series finale of 3rd Rock from the Sun
 2002 as himself on the episode "How I Spent My Strummer Vacation" of The Simpsons
 2003 as Ben on Frasier, in the season 10 episode "Farewell Nervosa"
 2003 as himself in I Love Your Work 
 2004 as himself in the UK TV Dead Ringers New Year Special, apparently and reportedly having serendipitously entered a filming venue.
 2004 as himself in Two and a Half Men – Season 2, Episode 1
 2004 as himself in De-Lovely
 2006 as himself in Delirious
 2006 as himself in Before the Music Dies
 2006 as himself in Putting the River in Reverse
 2006 as himself in Talladega Nights: The Ballad of Ricky Bobby
 2008 as himself in A Colbert Christmas: The Greatest Gift of All!
 2009 as himself on the 30 Rock episode "Kidney Now!"
 2010 as himself on Treme
 2017 as himself in Ex Libris – The New York Public Library
 2017–2019 as Pete's Dad (voice) in Pete the Cat (Season 1)

As part of soundtracks
 1983, "Party Party" appears in the film of the same name and on its soundtrack album.
 1991, "Days" (a cover of the Kinks song) appears in the film Until the end of the World and on its soundtrack album.
 1995, "My Dark Life," a collaboration with Brian Eno, appears on the album Songs in the Key of X. 
 1996, "God Give Me Strength," a collaboration with Burt Bacharach, appears in the film Grace of My Heart and on its soundtrack album. Nominated for Satellite Award for Best Original Song. 
 1998, "My Mood Swings" appears in the film The Big Lebowski and on its soundtrack album.
 1998, "I Throw My Toys Around," a collaboration with No Doubt, appears in the film The Rugrats Movie and on its soundtrack album.
 1999, "She" (a cover of the Charles Aznavour song) appears in the film Notting Hill and on its soundtrack album. The song peaked at No. 19 on the UK Singles Chart.
 2003, "The Scarlet Tide," written by Costello and T-Bone Burnett and performed by Alison Krauss, appears in the film Cold Mountain and on its soundtrack album. Nominated for Academy Award for Best Original Song and Grammy Award for Best Song Written for Visual Media.
 2019, "I Want You" appears twice in the critically acclaimed British film Only You.

Bibliography
1980: A Singing Dictionary  sheet music 
1983:  sheet music 
2016:   memoir

References

Further reading
 Paumgarten, Nick (8 November 2010). "Brilliant Mistakes". Profiles. The New Yorker. Vol. 86, no. 35. pp. 48–59.
 Perone, James E. (1998). Elvis Costello: A Bio-Bibliography. Westport, CT: Greenwood Press. .

External links

 Official Elvis Costello Lost Highway Records Artist Page
 

 
 The Elvis Costello Wiki (moved 2007 from original The Elvis Costello Home Page)

 
1954 births
Living people
Columbia Records artists
Deutsche Grammophon artists
Diana Krall
Elvis Costello & the Attractions members
English buskers
English expatriates in the United States
English male singer-songwriters
English new wave musicians
English people of Irish descent
English punk rock guitarists
English punk rock singers
English rock guitarists
English male guitarists
English rock singers
Grammy Award winners
Island Records artists
Lost Highway Records artists
Male new wave singers
Mercury Records artists
People from Paddington
Radar Records artists
Rykodisc artists
Second British Invasion artists
Singers from London
Stiff Records artists
2 Tone Records artists
Warner Records artists
Officers of the Order of the British Empire
The New Basement Tapes members
Concord Records artists
English autobiographers